Cornwall Park is an expansive parkland in Epsom near the heart of Auckland, New Zealand, surrounding the park containing  Maungakiekie pa or the hill of One Tree Hill.

The Park has centuries-old heritage sites, wide-open spaces, tree lined avenues and walks, places of peace and tranquility in a large city, sports grounds including tennis and bowls and a working farm for the education of city children.

John Logan Campbell, Auckland resident since 1840 and, at the time of this gift, mayor, gave the park's 230 acres to a private trust on 10 June 1901. The adjoining Park Maungakiekie had been purchased by the national government in 1845 and since 2012 belongs to Ngā Mana Whenua o Tāmaki Makaurau Collective.

Campbell chose to present the deeds the following day to the visiting heir to the throne, the Duke of Cornwall and York later George V asking his consent for it to be named Cornwall Park in honour of the Duke. A few weeks later the adjoining Alexandra Park was named in honour of the Duke's mother.

Origin

Land
Campbell gave the land to Cornwall Park Trust, a trust he had established for the purpose. He had planned to build a house there and planted the parkland in preparation for that but he subsequently chose to live near the centre of the city in Parnell, his home was named 'Kilbryde' and situated on part of the site of their rose gardens. Still marked by his trees the carriage drive he made in Cornwall Park sweeps in an S-bend from Puriri Drive across Greenlane west of the Park's Greenlane entrance to his house site near Huia Lodge. Visitors may walk along it from the gate opposite the Park's administration and works depot in Greenlane. There were to be further gifts including the land about Puriri Drive and Campbell Crescent and the endowment lands, housing sites to be made available on 21-year leases.

Cornwall Park operates Glasgow leases now outlawed in the United Kingdom. As property values increased in Auckland the formula for setting the rents has become unfair and unaffordable. Logan Campbell specified that leases would allow fair value to the leaseholders for improvements to the property. Some leaseholders have walked away from their family homes unable or unwilling to pay. Cornwall Park was unable to lease a section indicating perhaps that the formula is not economic and it has sat empty for 16 years. Cornwall Park Leaseholders Association was formed to represent leaseholders and negotiate a fairer lease. A petition has been launched seeking some of the Lusk KC Report findings including fair compensation for improvements or a freeholding option.

Cornwall Park Trust
The deeds handed to the trustees stated "the said lands are and shall be held by the Trustees on trust for the people of the colony of New Zealand, and also for such public purposes for the general benefit of the people of New Zealand in the way of affording them recreation, enjoyment, pleasure and instruction and other similar benefits and advantages of that nature as the Trustees shall from time to time consider best."

Management
The trustees, acting through The Cornwall Park Trust Board Inc, also manage the Campbell Trust. Until 2012 they also managed the One Tree Hill Domain on behalf of the Auckland Council. Their One Tree Hill Domain responsibility has ceased and Ngā Mana Whenua o Tāmaki Makaurau Collective decides upon and implements its own policies on Maungakiekie/One Tree Hill Domain.

The first Cornwall Park trustees were David Murdoch, Arthur Myers (chairman), Robert Hall and Alfred Bankart.

Chairmen of Trustees
A M Myers (1901–1926)
A S Bankart (1926–1927)
J H Gunson (1927–1956)
A U Wells (1956–1974)
B P Stevenson (1975–1983)
K B Myers (1983–1991)
R H L Ferguson (1991–2007)
H M Horton (2007–2011)
J L Clark (2011– )
J A W McConnell
A F Young-Cooper ( –present)

Design

A scheme was laid out by young landscape designer Austin Strong (1881–1952) inspired by Golden Gate Park in San Francisco.

Ongoing design is managed by New York-based landscape architecture firm Nelson Byrd Woltz Landscape Architects in collaboration with New Zealand-based Boffa Miskell.

Endowment
Together these new gifts made a total area of  within Cornwall Park.

However the trustees were personally liable for any expenditure that could not be met by the trust's funds and so in 1914 residential sites along Wheturangi Road were sold on long term lease to meet immediate needs for cash and the trustees asked that local bodies give consideration to some form of rate relief complaining that over 60 per cent of the trusts revenue went in taxes. St Cuthbert's College took 8 acres by the formal entrance on a 99-year building lease in 1919. After many years of petitions and representations from Auckland to Parliament in 1922 Parliament decided that the Cornwall Park land should be valued for rating purposes at its "restricted value", this valuation of the park having regard to its income as grazing land. By this time the capital value of the Park's land exceeded £200,000.

As  the Great Depression began to subside and New Zealand's new Socialist government began to change government's policies there was a leap in the Government's assessment for the park's land tax from £300 to £1,400. One Tree Hill Borough's councillors agreed to apply to the Government for the Government's consent to exempt the Park from payment of their rates on the Park's land. The Government agreed and passed enabling legislation in September 1938.

In 1952 following the death of his only daughter Campbell's remaining estate, then valued at £400,000, passed under the control of the Cornwall Park Trustees and the income is allocated according to Campbell's wishes to a wide range of purposes.

Income received by the trustees from the trust's property is exempt from Income Tax.

Restrictions
No more riding or golf
Soon after the beginning of World War II riding and golf were banned. Horses for the damage to lawns, although tracks were provided, and golf for the annoyance and danger to sheep grazing in the park. Subsequently it was decided that golf was not a use available to the people generally and did not comply with the trust deed and the Auckland Golf Club's and Maungakiekie Golf Club's privileges were ended. In any case the trust deed required construction of "Grand Avenue" through the land at present used for golf.

Cornwall Hospital

From 1942 to 1945 the park was occupied by the nation's defence forces as a site of temporary barracks and a temporary hospital was built for the United States Army in the eastern area of Cornwall Park. Initially for 1050 patients and their 715 attendants — the U.S. 39th General Hospital — it was very shortly doubled in capacity to 2,000 beds.

In 1944 the Government proposed to compulsorily acquire a portion of the land to build a home for blinded ex-servicemen. It was protested that in June 1942 an undertaking had been given that the area would not be used for other than war purposes but to no avail whatsoever. The hospital buildings became Cornwall Hospital and included maternity facilities, National Women's Hospital, and a geriatric hospital. All buildings on the site were demolished in 1975. The hospital for blinded servicemen remains in the adjoining Park Maungakiekie/One Tree Hill Domain, and is known as Sorrento in the Park, an events venue.

Activities
On top of admiring scenery, drinking tea while the Band plays on its rotunda, picnicking, birdwatching, walking, jogging, bicycling, keeping the dog secure on its leash and admiring the ewes and their lambs, provisions for formalised activities include:

Comparisons – area
Comparison with other significant city parks, worldwide:

Publications
The Cornwall Park Trust Board's publications include:
Poenamo Revisited, (2012) a facsimile of the 1898 edition of Campbell's autobiography with new annotations and many pictures.
Cornwall Park, the Story of a Man's Vision
Reminiscences of a Long Life, Sir John Logan Campbell, edited and introduced by R.C.J Stone, 2017.

Brochures
Sir John Logan Campbell
Cornwall Park
Cornwall Park Heritage TrailCornwall Park Tree Trail
Cornwall Park Bird Species
Cornwall Park FarmAcacia Cottage
Huia Lodge
Cornwall Hospital 1942–1975

Notes

References

Further reading 
 Pearson, Dave. (1995) 'A fine legacy'. Historic Places. No. 53, p. 6-8.

External links

 
 Cornwall Park Leaseholders Association 
 Map of Cornwall Park and its features
 Photographs of Cornwall Park held in Auckland Libraries' heritage collections.

1901 establishments in New Zealand
Māori culture in Auckland
Parks in Auckland
Tourist attractions in Auckland
Geography of Auckland
Sports venues in Auckland
Auckland volcanic field
Rugby union stadiums in New Zealand
Rugby league stadiums in New Zealand
Tennis venues in New Zealand
Bowls in New Zealand
Auckland cricket grounds
Urban forests in New Zealand